In 1882 a United States patent was granted for a mousetrap incorporating a handgun, "by which animals which burrow in the ground can be destroyed".
The patent application suggests that the device might also be used to kill "any person or thing" opening a door or window.

Design

US Patent 269766, awarded December 26, 1882, to James A. Williams of Fredonia, Mason County, Texas, describes a frame with a pistol or revolver secured to it, and a spring, levers and rod which would activate the gun's trigger when an animal stepped on a treadle in front of the muzzle, killing the animal.

Williams said that the invention could also be used to "kill any person or thing opening [a] door or window to which it is attached". He compared it to other similar inventions which were used as burglar alarms. He stated in his patent application that another feature of the design was that the gunshot would act as an alarm: when the trap's gun was fired the gunshot noise would notify the user that the trap had been triggered.

Reception
The United States Patent Office has issued more than 4,400 mousetrap patents. The gun-powered mouse trap proved inferior to spring-powered mousetraps descending from William C. Hooker's 1894 patent. However, the 1882 patent has continued to draw interest–including efforts to reconstruct a version of it–due to its unconventional design. In 2015 Vox listed Williams' device as Number 5 on its list of "7 horrifying attempts at building a better mousetrap", and in 2012 Business Insider called it "the best mousetrap ever".

See also

Spring-gun

References

External links

Youtube video: A Crazy 1882 Rodent Trap Design. "The World's Luckiest Rat"

Mammal pest control
Home appliances
Mice
Pest trapping
1882 introductions
19th-century inventions
Mason County, Texas
Handguns
Hunting in the United States
Hunting equipment